Joanna Budner (born December 27, 1988 in Łódź, Poland) is a Polish former ice dancer. With partner Jan Mościcki, she is a three-time (2007–2009) Polish national champion. Their partnership ended following the 2008-2009 season, and she retired shortly afterwards.

Competitive highlights

 N = Novice level; J = Junior level; WD = Withdrew
 JGP = Junior Grand Prix

External links
 
 Tracings.net profile

Living people
Polish female ice dancers
1988 births
Sportspeople from Łódź